Maurice Roucel is a contemporary French perfumer who has worked at the companies IFF, Quest, Dragoco and presently Symrise. Roucel began his career in perfumery on February 19, 1973, while working as the head chromatography chemist at Chanel for 6 years. He commenced his apprenticeship under Henri Robert, Chanel's house perfumer at the time. He joined Quest International and for 12 years developed his craft as a perfumer before switching to work for Symrise in 1996. Most of the fragrances composed by Roucel have his signature scent of Michelia longifolia.

He was also the winner of various accolades in the fragrance industry including the Prix François Coty in 2002, and the French and American FiFi as well as the French "Oscar des Parfums" Awards.

List of creations
Maurice Roucel has created  perfumes including:

 Envy for Gucci 1997
 24 Faubourg for Hermès 1995
 Iris Silver Mist for Serge Lutens 1994
 K de Krizia 1981
 Tocade for Rochas
 L'Instant de Guerlain for Guerlain 2004
 Insolence for Guerlain 2005
 L'Instant Magic for Guerlain
 L'Instant Fleur de Mandarine for Guerlain
 Helmut Lang Eau de Parfum 2000
 Helmut Lang Eau de Cologne 2000
 Hypnose Homme for Lancôme 2007
 Le Labo Jasmine 17 2006
 Le Labo Labdanum 18 2006
Reminiscence Jammin
Roberto Cavalli 2002
Roberto Cavalli Oro 2004
R de Revillon 1995
Irium Pour Homme Fabergé 1996
Hunca Asimetri Eau de Parfum
Samba Unzipped by the Perfumer's Workshop LTD
Eros Homme by Tristano Onofri
 Musc Ravageur for Editions de Parfums Frederic Malle 2000
Nautica Voyage 2006
Nautica Voyage Island
Kiton Black for Kiton 2007
DKNY Be Delicious
DKNY Be Delicious Charmingly
DKNY Red Delicious
DKNY Red Delicious Charmingly
Missoni 1981
Missoni Aqua
Celine Dion Sensational
L de Lolita Lempicka 2006
Fleur de Corail Lolita Lempicka
Castelbajac de Jean Charles de Castelbajac
Dunhill Fresh for Men
Dunhill Desire for Women
Ellen Tracy Imagine 2003
Mac Vanilla
Ispahan by Yves Rocher 1982
Rochas Man by Rochas 1999
Monsoon by Parfums Monsoon 1994
Pleasures Intense for Men by Estee Lauder,
Kenzo Air 2003
Lalique pour Homme 1997
Shalini by Shalini 2004
Guess? (reformulation) 2005
GF Ferre Lei for Women
Bogart pour Homme by Jacques Bogart
Jaguar Woman by Pardis 2004
Gai Mattiolo Man 1998
TL pour Lui in collaboration with Norbert Bijaoui for Ted Lapidus 2003
Strenesse by Gabriele Strehle 1999
Bond No. 9 Broadway Nite 2003
Bond No. 9 New Haarlem 2003
Bond No. 9 Riverside Drive 2003
Lyra Alain Delon 1993
Colbalt pour Homme by Parera
Marc Jacobs Orange
Adidas Sport for Men 1994
Adidas Vitality for Women 2008
Plaisir de Parfums Lorebat Gal (Spain)
We're For Men Shiseido
We're For Women Shiseido
BCBG Star Girl
Sport by Wilkinson and Sword
Impressions C'est Mysterieux
Ulric de Varens No. 2 UDV 1997
Tisbe by Natura
Eau de Coty Eau de Cologne Fresh
HF Kanebo (Japan)
Pursence by Mondi
Princesse Charlotte de Sedan
Laura Mercier Neroli
I Coloniali Essenza alla Peonia by Atkinsons
Max Factor Royal Regiment
Samurai by Oriflame
Urban Homme for David Beckham 2013
Un Monde Nouveau
White Fluid
So Chic
Cherry Cherie
Satin Instinct
Ariane Inden
Actuality Eau de Parfum
Le Deux No. 2 Latour
Les Eaux Gourmandes Orage Eau de Toilette by Carla
Octee No. 4
Extase for Men by Royal Sanders
Amance by Royal Sanders
Country for Men by Ellen Betrix
Guerlain Candle Bois des Indes
Guerlain Candle Pivoine
Dans tes Bras (2008) for Editions de Parfums Frederic Malle
Luminata for Avon
Amorem Rose by Shalini 2018
Jardin Nocturne by Shalini 2017
Paradis Provence by Shalini 2019
A Blvd. Called Sunset for What We Do Is Secret 2020
Uncut Gem for Editions de Parfums Frederic Malle 2022

References

Year of birth missing (living people)
French perfumers
Living people